This is a work-in-progress partial list of people involved in dance

Alphabetical

A
 Eleonora Abbagnato - Italian ballet dancer
 Stella Abrera - Filipino-American ballet dancer
 Carlos Acosta - Cuban ballet dancer and artistic director of Birmingham Royal Ballet
 Precious Adams - American ballet dancer
 Carolina Agüero - Argentine ballet dancer
 Joo Won Ahn - South Korean ballet dancer
 Alvin Ailey - modern choreographer
 Heléne Alexopoulos - American ballet dancer
 Alicia Alonso - Cuban prima ballerina assoluta
 Alicia Amatriain - Spanish ballet dancer
 Dores André - Spanish ballet dancer
 Elena Andreianova - considered the outstanding Russian ballerina of the romantic genre
 Gasparo Angiolini - Italian ballet dancer, choreographer and theoretician
 Ann-Margret (no surname) - Swedish-American dancer, actress, and singer in films; Viva Las Vegas
 Aesha Ash - American ballet dancer
 Merrill Ashley - American ballet dancer
 Frederick Ashton - British ballet dancer and choreographer
 Charles Askegard - American ballet dancer
 Adele Astaire - American Broadway dancer and singer; Fred Astaire's dance partner, 1905–1931
 Fred Astaire - American film and Broadway dancer, choreographer, singer and actor
 Gary Avis - British ballet dancer
 Silvia Azzoni - Italian ballet dancer

B
 Elisa Badenes - Spanish ballet dancer
 George Balanchine - choreographer credited for bridging classical and modern ballet
 Caroline Baldwin (born 1990) - American ballet dancer
 Matthew Ball - British ballet dancer
 Ashley Banjo - choreographer and leader of Diversity (dance troupe)
 Marie Barch (1744–1827) - first native Danish ballerina
 Aszure Barton - Canadian choreographer
 Mikhail Baryshnikov - Russian ballet dancer
 Léonore Baulac - French ballet dancer
 Vytautas Beliajus - Lithuanian-American, considered the father of international folk dance
 Jérémie Bélingard - French ballet dancer
 Aran Bell - American ballet dancer
 Leanne Benjamin - Australian ballet dancer
 Hanna Berger - German-Austrian dancer and resistance fighter
 Hannelore Bey - German ballet dancer
 Joan Boada - Cuban ballet dancer
 Gertrud Bodenwieser - Austrian dancer, choreographer, dance teacher and pioneer of modern dance
 Roberto Bolle - Italian ballet dancer
 Antoine Bournonville - French ballet dancer
 August Bournonville - Danish ballet dancer and choreographer
 Julie Bournonville - ballet dancer
 Julio Bocca - Argentine ballet dancer
 Roberto Bolle - Italian ballet dancer
 Federico Bonelli - Italian ballet dancer
 Hélène Bouchet - French ballet dancer
 Ashley Bouder - American ballet dancer
 Kent Boyd - American teen dancing sensation; runner-up of Season 7 of So You Think You Can Dance; contemporary jazz, Broadway
 Isabella Boylston - American ballet dancer
 Skylar Brandt - American ballet dancer
 James Brown - African American dancer, entertainer, singer, musician and songwriter
 Erik Bruhn - Danish ballet dancer and choreographer
 Stéphane Bullion - French ballet dancer
 Cheryl Burke - American ballroom and Latin dancer
 Darcey Bussell - British ballet dancer and TV presenter

C
 Rita Cadillac - Brazilian dancer and singer
 Maria Calegari - American ballet dancer
 Claire Calvert - British ballet dancer
 Alexander Campbell - Australian ballet dancer
 Leslie Caron - French-born ballet dancer and American film actress
 José Manuel Carreño - Cuban ballet dancer
 Elisa Carrillo Cabrera - Mexican ballet dancer
 Yvonne Cartier - British ballet dancer, mime and teacher
 Irene Castle - ballroom dancer
 Vernon Castle - ballroom dancer
 Vakhtang Chabukiani - ballet dancer
 Guru Chandrasekharan - Indian dancer
 Cyd Charisse - American ballet and film dancer
 Sidi Larbi Cherkaoui - Belgian choreographer, artistic director of Royal Ballet of Flanders
 Yuhui Choe - Korean ballet dancer
 Frances Chung - Canadian ballet dancer
 Jeffrey Cirio - American ballet dancer
 Lia Cirio - American ballet dancer
 The Clark Brothers - tap dancers
 Alina Cojocaru - Romanian ballet dancer
 Valentine Colasante - French ballet dancer
 Deborah Colker - Brazilian writer, theater director, dancer and choreographer
 Calico Cooper - American film actress/dancer, daughter of Alice Cooper
 Jonathan Cope - British ballet dancer
 Misty Copeland - American ballet dancer
 Bernice Coppieters - Belgian ballet dancer
 Jean Coralli - French ballet dancer and choreographer
 Angel Corella - Spanish premier danseur
 Erica Cornejo - Argentine ballet dancer
 Herman Cornejo - Argentine ballet dancer
 Cesar Corrales - Canadian ballet dancer
 Joaquín Cortés - Spanish ballet dancer and choreographer
 Guillaume Côté - Canadian ballet dancer and choreographer
 J'aime Crandall - American ballet dancer
 John Cranko - South African ballet dancer and choreographer
 Dick Crum - American prominent folk dance teacher
 Merce Cunningham - choreographer
 Lauren Cuthbertson - English ballet dancer

D
 Sophie Daguin - ballet mistress and ballerina
 Dan Dailey - American film actor and dancer
 Jean Dauberval - French dancer and choreographer
 Shiamak Davar - Indian choreographer
 David Dawson - British choreographer
 Igone de Jongh - Dutch ballet dancer
 Anne Teresa De Keersmaeker
 Louis Deland - ballet master, ballet dancer, choreographer
 Patricia Delgado - American ballet dancer, répétiteur and teacher
 Michaela DePrince - Sierra Leonean-American ballet dancer
 Gaby Deslys - French ballroom dancer and actress
 Sasha De Sola - American ballet dancer
 Prabhu Deva - Indian dancer and choreographer
 Julie Diana - American ballet dancer, ballet master, writer and arts administrator
 Charles-Louis Didelot - French dancer and choreographer
 Anton Dolin - English ballet dancer and choreographer
 Holly Dorger - American ballet dancer
 Anthony Dowell - English ballet dancer and choreographer
 Jurgita Dronina - Russian-Lithuanian ballet dancer
 Remo D'Souza - Indian Bollywood choreographer
 Tabitha and Napoleon D'umo a.k.a. "Nappytabs" - dance teachers, choreographers, and creative directors
 Isadora Duncan - "mother of modern dance"
 Katherine Dunham - pioneer of black dance, anthropologist, dancer, choreographer, creator of the Dunham Technique
 Aurélie Dupont - French ballet dancer and artistic director of Paris Opera Ballet
 Irina Dvorovenko - Ukrainian-American ballet dancer

E
 Madeleine Eastoe - Australian ballet dancer
 Andre Eglevsky - Russian-American ballet dancer and teacher; performed in Charles Chaplin's film  Limelight
 Alexander Ekman - Swedish choreographer
 Jorma Elo - Finnish choreographer
 Fanny Elssler - Austrian ballet dancer and actress
 Sorella Englund - ballet dancer

F
 Adolfina Fägerstedt - Swedish ballerina 
 Robert Fairchild - American ballet dancer and actor
 Silas Farley - ballet dancer, choreographer and educator
 Suzanne Farrell - ballet dancer
 Jane Farwell - folk dance teacher
 Marie Favart - French ballet dancer
 Lorena Feijóo - Cuban ballet dancer
 Lorna Feijóo - Cuban ballet dancer
 Alessandra Ferri - Italian prima ballerina assoluta
 Nikisha Fogo - Swedish ballet dancer
 Michel Fokine - Russian choreographer
 Margot Fonteyn - foremost British ballerina and assoluta
 Thomas Forster (dancer) - English ballet dancer
 Bob Fosse - American dancer and musical theater choreographer
 Alina Frasa - Finnish ballet dancer and choreographer
 Francesco Gabriele Frola - Italian ballet dancer
 Anine Frölich - Danish ballerina
 Jovani Furlan - Brazilian ballet dancer

G
 Mara Galeazzi - Italian ballet dancer
 Louis Gallodier - ballet master and choreographer
 Mathieu Ganio - French ballet dancer
 Gonzalo Garcia - Spanish ballet dancer
 Daniel Gaudiello - Australian ballet dancer
 Asen Gavrilov - Bulgarian ballet dancer and choreographer
 Mitzi Gaynor - American film actress and dancer
 Gisa Geert - Austrian actress and choreographer
 Yekaterina Geltzer - prima ballerina of the Bolshoi in the 1910s and 1920s
 Adeline Genée - Danish ballet dancer
 Angelica Generosa - American ballet dancer
 Yvonne Georgi - German ballet dancer
 Elizaveta Gerdt - Russian dancer and teacher
 Pavel Gerdt - "Prince of the St Petersburg stage"
 Dorothée Gilbert - French ballet dancer
 Marie-Agnès Gillot - French ballet dancer and choreographer
 Ailes Gilmour - early Martha Graham dancer, socialist activist, and sister of Isamu Noguchi
 Céline Gittens - Trinidadian ballet dancer
 Alexander Godunov - Russian dancer who defected to the West
 Matthew Golding - Canadian ballet dancer
 Jeffrey Golladay - American ballet dancer
 Chachi Gonzales - American hip-hop dancer
 Betty Grable - American film actress and dancer
 Alicia Graf Mack - American dancer
 Martha Graham - American dancer and choreographer
 Carolina Granberg - Swedish ballerina 
 Yury Grigorovich - Russian dancer and choreographer
 Fabio Grossi - Italian ballet dancer
 Victor Gsovsky - Russian ballet dancer and choreographer
 Sylvie Guillem - French ballet dancer

H
 Craig Hall - American ballet dancer
 David Hallberg - American ballet dancer
 Anna Halprin - American postmodern dancer and teacher
 Melissa Hamilton - Irish ballet dancer
 MC Hammer - American hip hop dancer, rapper and choreographer
 Christopher Hampson - English ballet dancer and choreographer, artistic director of Scottish Ballet
 Mata Hari - Dutch born dancer, courtesan and alleged spy
 Evelyn Hart - ballet dancer
 Sarah Hay - American actress and ballet dancer
 Francesca Hayward - British ballet dancer
 Rita Hayworth - American film dancer and actress
 Robyn Hendricks - South African ballet dancer
 Robert Helpmann - ballet dancer
 Susan Hendl - American ballet dancer and répétiteur
 Heike Hennig - German dancer and choreographer
 Audrey Hepburn - ballerina and movie star
 Isaac Hernández - Mexican ballet dancer
 Paloma Herrera - Argentine ballet dancer and artistic director of Colon Theater Ballet
 Laurent Hilaire - French ballet dancer, ballet master and associate director of the Paris Opera Ballet
 Ryoichi Hirano - Japanese ballet dancer
 Hedda Hjortsberg - ballet dancer
 Greta Hodgkinson - American-Canadian ballet dancer
 Hilde Holger - Austro-British expressionist dancer, choreographer, and pioneer of physically integrated dance
 Anna Sophia Holmstedt - ballet dancer
 Melissa Hough - American ballet dancer
 Dulcie Howes - South African ballet dancer and founder of Cape Town City Ballet
 Nikolaj Hübbe - Danish ballet dancer, artistic director of Royal Danish Ballet
 Catherine Hurlin - American ballet dancer
 Sterling Hyltin - American ballet dancer

I
 Carrie Imler - American ballet dancer

J
 Janet Jackson - American dancer, choreographer, actor and singer
 Kevin Jackson - Australian ballet dancer
 Michael Jackson - American dancer, choreographer, singer and entertainer
 Rowena Jackson - New Zealand prima ballerina of the Royal Ballet
 Drew Jacoby - American contemporary ballet dancer
 Zizi Jeanmaire - French ballet dancer
 Whitney Jensen - American ballet dancer
 Lana Jones - Australian ballet dancer
 Raghav Juyal - unique dancer in India, known for an imitative dance style, choreographer, dancer and also known for slo-motion dance style.

K
 Karen Kain - Canadian prima ballerina
 Yuriko Kajiya - Japanese ballet dancer
 Fumi Kaneko - Japanese ballet dancer
 Kang Sue-jin - Korean ballet dancer
 Vera Karalli - ballet dancer and actress
 Gene Kelly - American film and stage dancer, choreographer, singer, actor and film director
 Julie Kent - American ballet dancer and artistic director of The Washington Ballet
 Akram khan - English dancer and choreographer
 Farah Khan - Indian Bollywood choreographer and filmmaker
 Saroj Khan - Indian Bollywood choreographer
 Michael Kidd - American Broadway and film choreographer and dancer
 Ty King-Wall - New Zealand ballet dancer
 Gelsey Kirkland - former legendary American Ballet Theatre and Principal dancer with the New York City Ballet
 Nehemiah Kish - American ballet dancer
 Daria Klimentová - Czech ballet dancer, teacher and photographer
 Hikaru Kobayashi - Japanese ballet dancer
 Maria Kochetkova - Russian ballet dancer
 Ako Kondo - Japanese ballet dancer
 Carla Körbes - Brazilian ballet dancer
 Maria Kowroski - American ballet dancer
 Gertrud Kraus - Israeli pioneer of modern dance
 Rebecca Krohn - American ballet dancer
 Mathilde Kschessinska - second prima ballerina assoluta
 Misa Kuranaga - Japanese ballet dancer
 Stephanie Kurlow - first Hijabi ballerina
 Jiří Kylián - Czech choreographer

L
 Rudolf Laban - choreographer, inventor of Labanotation
 Lucia Lacarra - Spanish ballet dancer
 Eddie Ladd - Welsh Physical Theatre performer and dancer
 Sarah Lamb - American ballet dancer
 Jean-Baptiste Landé - founder of the Russian ballet
 Sarah Lane - American ballet dancer
 Tina LeBlanc - American ballet dancer, teacher and ballet master
 Louise Lecavalier - icon of Canadian contemporary dance
 Douglas Lee - British ballet dancer and choreographer
 Manuel Legris - French ballet dancer and artistic director of Vienna State Ballet
 Pierina Legnani - first prima ballerina assoluta
 Sara Leland - American ballet dancer and répétiteur
 Alban Lendorf - Danish ballet dancer
 Nicolas Le Riche - French ballet dancer and choreographer
 Lawrence Leritz - American dancer and choreographer
 Agnès Letestu - French ballet dancer
 Tracy Li - Chinese ballet dancer; a senior principal in the Cape Town City Ballet, South Africa
 Edwaard Liang - Taiwanese-born American dancer and choreographer
 Serge Lifar - Ukrainian ballet dancer and choreographer
 Maude Lloyd - South African ballerina and dance critic
 Elena Lobsanova - Russian-Canadian ballet dancer
 Jennifer Lopez - American (Puerto Rican descent) dancer, singer and actress
 Annabelle Lopez Ochoa - Belgian choreographer
 Lydia Lopokova - Russian ballet dancer
 Lauren Lovette - American ballet dancer and choreographer
 Svetlana Lunkina - Russian ballet dancer

M
 Brooklyn Mack - American ballet dancer
 Mayara Magri - Brazilian ballet dancer
 Shantanu Maheshwari - Indian dancer, choreographer and actor
 Natascha Mair - Austrian ballet dancer
 Natalia Makarova - Russian ballet dancer
 David Makhateli - Georgian ballet dancer
 Maia Makhateli - Georgian ballet dancer
 Marianna Malińska (1767–fl.1797) - first native ballerina in Poland
 Hugo Marchand - French ballet dancer
 Paul Marque - French ballet dancer
 Roberta Marquez - Brazilian ballet dancer
 Cathy Marston - British choreographer
 Sophie Martin - French ballet dancer
 Kizzy Matiakis - English ballet dancer
 José Martínez - Spanish ballet dancer
 William Matons - WPA-era, 1930s modern dancer and choreographer, known later during Calypso craze as Calypso Joe, and later still as General Hershy Bar
 Sabrina Matthews - Canadian ballet choreographer and former ballet dancer
 Kay Mazzo - American ballet dancer and educator, Chairman of Faculty of School of American Ballet
 David McAllister - Australian ballet dancer, former artistic director of The Australian Ballet
 Wayne McGregor - British choreographer
 Trey McIntyre - American dancer and choreographer
 Amanda McKerrow - American ballet dancer
 Rachael McLaren - Canadian dancer
 Steven McRae - Australian ballet dancer
 Tate McRae - first-ever Canadian finalist in So You Think You Can Dance
 Sara Mearns - American ballet dancer
 Vrushika Mehta - Indian contemporary dancer and television actress
 Itziar Mendizabal - Spanish ballet dancer
 Sulamith Messerer - founder of Japanese ballet
 Jo Mihaly - German dancer and writer
 Ann Miller - American tap dancer, singer, and actress, especially in films
 Arthur Mitchell - American artistic director, educator, choreographer and dancer
 Shakti Mohan - Indian contemporary dancer and winner of Dance India Dance 2
 Baisali Mohanty - Indian classical dancer and choreographer
 Pippa Moore - English ballet dancer
 Laura Morera - Spanish ballet dancer
 Kathryn Morgan - American ballet dancer and YouTuber
 Mary Ellen Moylan - American ballet dancer
 Hope Muir - Canadian dancer, artistic director of National Ballet of Canada, former artistic director of Charlotte Ballet
 Vadim Muntagirov - Russian ballet dancer
 Gillian Murphy - American ballet dancer
 Graeme Murphy - Australian choreographer 
 Arthur Murray - dance instructor and businessman, known for the Arthur Murray Dance Studios franchise

N
 Yasmine Naghdi - British ballet dancer
 Gene Nelson - American film dancer, actor and television director
 Nadia Nerina - South African ballet dancer
 John Neumeier - American choreographer, artistic director of Hamburg Ballet
 Nicholas Brothers - African American dancing brothers (Fayard and Harold) known for their acrobatic techniques
 Kyra Nichols - American ballet dancer and teacher
 Nikolina Nikoleski - Croatian teacher and choreographer of Bharatnatyam
 Vaslav Nijinsky - Russian ballet dancer and choreographer
 Ena Noël - Australian children's author and ballet dancer
 Charlotta Norberg - Swedish ballerina
 Dominic North - British ballet dancer
 Siphesihle November - South African ballet dancer
 Ivan Novikoff - ballet master, founder of Novikoff School of Russian-American Ballet
 Marianela Nuñez - Argentine-British ballet dancer
 Rudolf Nureyev - Russian ballet dancer

O
 Agnes Oaks - Estonian ballet dancer
 Donald O'Connor - American dancer, singer and actor
 Heather Ogden - Canadian ballet dancer
 Fernanda Oliveira - Brazilian ballet dancer
 Jonathan Ollivier - British dancer
 Hannah O'Neill - New Zealand ballet dancer
 Simona Orinska - only butoh artist in Latvia; multidisciplinary artist; contemporary dancer, poet, director and choreographer of many art projects; practitioner of dance therapy or dance movement therapy
 Nancy Osbaldeston - English ballet dancer
 Natalia Osipova - Russian ballet dancer
 Clairemarie Osta - French ballet dancer
 Anna Rose O'Sullivan - British ballet dancer
 Sonia Osorio - Ballet de Colombia founder

P
 Stephen Page - Australian choreographer, artistic director of Bangarra Dance Theatre
 Ludmila Pagliero - Argentine ballet dancer
 Maria Palmer - Austrian-born American actress and dancer
 Hermes Pan - film choreographer, especially in collaboration with Fred Astaire
 Noelani Pantastico - American ballet dancer
 Merle Park - Zimbabwean ballerina at the Royal Ballet
 Sae Eun Park - South Korean ballet dancer
 Georgina Parkinson - English ballet dancer and ballet mistress
 Veronika Part - Russian ballet dancer
 Anna Pavlova - legendary Russian prima ballerina, who brought ballet to the world
 Georgina Pazcoguin - American ballet dancer
 Justin Peck - American ballet dancer and choreographer
 Tiler Peck - American ballet dancer
 Rupert Pennefather - English ballet dancer
 Tina Pereira - Trinidadian-Canadian ballet dancer
 Rosie Perez - American (Afro-Puerto Rican descent) dancer, choreographer, actress and director
 Jules Perrot - French ballet dancer and choreographer
 Marius Petipa - choreographer who created the classical ballet
 Vilhelm Pettersson - Swedish ballet dancer
 Unity Phelan - American ballet dancer
 Juanita Pitts - African-American tap dancer
 Maya Plisetskaya - prima ballerina assoluta of the Bolshoi Ballet from 1960 to 1990
 David Poole - South African ballet dancer and ballet master at Cape Town City Ballet
 Eleanor Powell - American actress and dancer of the 1930s and 1940s, known for her exuberant solo tap dancing
 Ida Praetorius - Danish ballet dancer
 Angelin Preljocaj - French dancer and choreographer
 Olga Preobrajenska - Russian dancer and teacher
 Juliet Prowse - South African-American dancer, actress, and singer in many films, including G.I. Blues, which also starred Elvis Presley
 Laetitia Pujol - French ballet dancer
 Brian Puspos - American hip-hop dancer, choreographer

R
 Sascha Radetsky - American ballet dancer and artistic director of American Ballet Theatre Studio Company
 Samantha Raine - British ballet dancer and ballet mistress 
 Daniel Rajna - South African ballet dancer, currently a principal in the Cape Town City Ballet
 Tina Ramirez - founder and artistic director of Ballet Hispanico
 Teresa Reichlen - American ballet dancer
 Alice Renavand - French ballet dancer
 Dwight Rhoden - American choreographer, artistic director of Complexions Contemporary Ballet
 Moon Ribas - choreographer with a cybernetic sensor attached to her body that allows her to feel earthquakes
 María Noel Riccetto - Uruguayan ballet dancer 
 Jenifer Ringer - American ballet dancer and teacher
 Jerome Robbins - American choreographer
 Sonia Rodriguez - Canadian ballet dancer
 Ginger Rogers - American film and stage dancer, singer and actress, most remembered as partner of Fred Astaire
 Tamara Rojo - Spanish ballet dancer and artistic director of English National Ballet
 Pedro Romeiras - dancer gold medal winner 1982 II Prix Français de la Danse
 Gunhild Rosén - Swedish ballerina, ballet master and choreographer
 Danielle Rowe - Australian ballet dancer and choreographer
 Calvin Royal III - American ballet dancer

S
 Stephanie Saland - American ballet dancer and teacher
 Iana Salenko - Ukrainian-German ballet dancer
 Marcelino Sambé - Portuguese ballet dancer
 Oh Sehun - South Korean dancer and member of EXO
 Ruth St. Denis - American dancer who tried to fuse modern dance with Egyptian and east Asian ideas; famously in collaboration with her partner Ted Shawn
 Olga Sandberg (1844–1926) - Swedish ballerina
 Margrethe Schall - ballerina
 Silja Schandorff - Danish ballet dancer
 Amanda Schull - American actress and ballet dancer
 Amber Scott - Australian ballet dancer
 Anders Selinder - ballet master and choreographer
 Polina Semionova - Russian ballet dancer
 Hee Seo - South Korean ballet dancer
 Lynn Seymour - Canadian ballet dancer
 Uday Shankar (Bengali: উদয় শংকর) (1900–1977) - pioneer of modern dance in India; world-renowned Indian dancer and choreographer; known for adapting Western theatrical techniques to traditional Indian classical dance, imbued with elements of Indian classical, folk, and tribal dance, thus laying the roots of modern Indian dance, which he popularized in India, Europe, and the United States in the 1920s and 1930s
 Ted Shawn - ballet dancer often in collaboration with his influential partner Ruth St. Denis; they were the creators of Denishawn
 Moira Shearer - Scottish ballet dancer and actress in The Red Shoes
 Fang-Yi Sheu - Taiwanese dancer
 Ingrid Silva - Brazilian ballet dancer
 Daniil Simkin - ballet dancer
 Mary Skeaping - British ballerina
 Charlotte Slottsberg - ballet dancer
 Damian Smith - Australian ballet dancer
 Thiago Soares - Brazilian ballet dancer
 Yuri Soloviev - soloist of the Kirov Theatre
 Jennie Somogyi - American ballet dancer
 Phyllis Spira-Boyd - South African ballet dancer
 Abi Stafford - American ballet dancer
 Jonathan Stafford - American ballet dancer and artistic director of New York City Ballet
 Taylor Stanley - American ballet dancer
 Cory Stearns - American ballet dancer
 Lisa Steier - Swedish ballerina
 Dana Stephensen - Australian ballet dancer
 Ethan Stiefel - American ballet dancer and choreographer
 Beatriz Stix-Brunell - American ballet dancer
 Madoka Sugai - Japanese ballet dancer
 Laurretta Summerscales - British ballet dancer
 Sofiane Sylve - French ballet dancer
 Sofia Boutella - Algerian hip hop dancer
 Shobana - Indian Bharatanatyam dancer

T
 Marie Taglioni - Italian ballet dancer
 Akane Takada - Japanese ballet dancer
 Erina Takahashi - Japanese ballet dancer
 Janie Taylor - American ballet dancer
 Paul Taylor - American choreographer
 Devon Teuscher - America ballet dancer
 Twyla Tharp - American dancer and choreographer
 Emmanuel Thibault (born 1974) - dancer, Paris Opera Ballet
 Lisa Joann Thompson (born 1969) - Warrior Girl, Laker Girl, Fly Girl, and Motown Live dancer
 Helgi Tómasson, Icelandic ballet dancer and choreographer, artistic director of [[San Francisco Ballet
 Mark Tompkins (born 1954) - American-born French artist, dancer and choreographer of contemporary dance
 Tamara Toumanova (1919–1997) - one of Balanchine's three "Baby Ballerinas"
 Elizabeth Triegaardt - South African ballerina and current director of Cape Town City Ballet
 Anna Tsygankova - Russian ballet dancer
 Cassandra Trenary - American ballet dancer
 Roger Tully (1928–2020) - dancer, teacher

U
 Galina Ulanova (1910–1998) - Soviet prima ballerina assoluta
 Eric Underwood - America British ballet dancer

V
 Agrippina Vaganova - founder of Vaganova method
 Dame Ninette de Valois - founder of the Royal Ballet of London
 Rudi van Dantzig - Dutch choreographer
 Hans van Manen - Dutch ballet dancer, choreographer and photographer
 Sarah Van Patten - American ballet dancer
 Jillian Vanstone - Canadian ballet dancer
 Francesca Velicu - Romanian ballet dancer
 Vera-Ellen - American Broadway and film dancer and actress
 Gwen Verdon - Broadway dancer and actress
 Ben Vereen - Tony Award-winning, Emmy Award-nominated actor, dancer and singer
 Friedemann Vogel - German ballet dancer
 Anastasia Volochkova - Russian prima ballerina

W
 Katita Waldo - Spanish ballet dancer and ballet master
 Peter Walker - American ballet dancer and choreographer
 Cilli Wang - Austrian-born Dutch dancer, performer and theater maker
 Edward Watson - British ballet dancer
 Miranda Weese - American ballet dancer
 Stanton Welch - Australian ballet dancer and choreographer, artistic director of Houston Ballet
 Christopher Wheeldon - British choreographer
 Wendy Whelan - American ballet dancer and associate artistic director of New York City Ballet
 James Whiteside - American ballet dancer
 Joy Womack - American ballet dancer
 Peter Wright - British ballet dancer and choreographer
 Leni Wylliams - African-American dancer/choreographer/master-teacher

Y 
 Nadia Yanowsky - Spanish ballet dancer
 Yury Yanowsky - Spanish ballet dancer
 Zenaida Yanowsky - Spanish ballet dancer
 Lillian "Billie" Yarbo - Broadway dancer and comedienne 
 Miyako Yoshida - Japanese ballet dancer
 Nellie Yu Roung Ling - Chinese dancer

Z 
 Vanessa Zahorian - American ballet dancer
 Maddie Ziegler - American dancer

By occupation in ballet

Theatre directors
 Gerald Arpino
 Jean Dauberval
 Sergei Diaghilev
 Robert Joffrey
 Louis XIV
 Jean-Baptiste Lully
 Catherine de' Medici
 Marie Rambert
 Ninette de Valois
 Robert de Warren

Choreographers

 Sir Frederick Ashton
 George Balanchine
 Pierre Beauchamp
 Erik Bruhn
 John Cranko
 Peter Darrell
 Mikhail Fokine
 William Forsythe
 Yury Grigorovich
 Lev Ivanovich Ivanov
 Serge Lifar
 Kenneth MacMillan
 Léonide Massine
 Sabrina Matthews
 Bronislava Nijinska
 Vaslav Nijinsky
 Jean-Georges Noverre
 Rudolf Nureyev
 Jules Perrot
 Marius Petipa
 Roland Petit
 Jerome Robbins
 Filippo Taglioni
 Antony Tudor
 Robert de Warren

Dancers

 Carlos Acosta
 Alicia Alonso
 Ann-Margret
 Mikhail Baryshnikov
 Jérémie Bélingard
 Maxim Beloserkovsky
 Ashley Bouder
 Erik Bruhn
 Fernando Bujones
 Darcey Bussell
 Jennifer Butler
 Leslie Caron
 Jose Manuel Carreno
 Fanny Cerito
 Vakhtang Chabukiani
 Cyd Charisse
 Alina Cojocaru
 Angel Corella
 Anton Dolin
 Aurelie Dupont
 Irina Dvorovenko
 Fanny Elssler
 Megan Fairchild
 Suzanne Farrell
 Alessandra Ferri
 Margot Fonteyn
 Yekaterina Geltzer
 Adeline Genée
 Pavel Gerdt
 Ailes Gilmour
 Jeffrey Golladay
 Marcelo Gomes
 Lucile Grahn
 Carlotta Grisi
 Fabio Grossi
 Sylvie Guillem
 Rex Harrington
 Evelyn Hart
 Melissa Hayden
 Paloma Herrera
 Laurent Hilaire
 Greta Hodgkinson
 Rowena Jackson
 Karen Kain
 Allegra Kent
 Julie Kent
 Darci Kistler
 Johan Kobborg
 Maria Kochetkova
 Maria Kowroski
 Mathilde Kschessinska
 Pierina Legnani
 Manuel Legris
 Lawrence Leritz
 Agnes Letestu
 Emma Livry
 Uliana Lopatkina
 Joaquín De Luz
 Vladimir Malakhov
 Alicia Markova
 José Martínez
 Patricia McBride
 Gillian Murphy
 Peter Naumann
 Nadia Nerina
 Kyra Nichols
 Vaslav Nijinsky
 Marianela Nunez
 Rudolf Nureyev
 Anna Pavlova
 Élisabeth Platel
 Maya Plisetskaya
 Olga Preobrajenska
 Juliet Prowse
 Laetitia Pujol
 Rolando Sarabia
 Moira Shearer
 Yuri Soloviev
 Phyllis Spira
 Ethan Stiefel
 Sofiane Sylve
 Marie Taglioni
 Maria Tallchief
 Ludmilla Tchérina
 Emmanuel Thibault
 Galina Ulanova
 Auguste Vestris
 Gaetan Vestris
 Diana Vishneva
 Wendy Whelan
 Miyako Yoshida
 Svetlana Zakharova

Teachers
 Thoinot Arbeau
 Cyril Atanassoff
 George Balanchine
 Claude Bessy
 Pierre Beauchamp
 Carlo Blasis
 August Bournonville
 Enrico Cecchetti
 Raoul-Auger Feuillet
 Elisabeth Gerdt
 Rosella Hightower
 Stanley Holden
 Victor Kanevsky
 Gelsey Kirkland
 Attilio Labis
 Nicolai Legat
 Sulamith Messerer
 Peter Naumann
 Anna Pavlova
 Jules Perrot
 Domenico da Piacenza
 Olga Preobrajenska
 Roma Pryma-Bohachevsky
 Pierre Rameau
 Jerome Robbins
 Víctor Ullate
 Agrippina Vaganova
 Auguste Vestris
 Vera Volkova
 Stanley Williams

Designers and scenographers
 Léon Bakst
 Alexandre Benois
 Christian Bérard
 Georges Braque
 Marc Chagall
 John Craxton
 Salvador Dalí
 André Derain
 Barbara Karinska
 Barry Kay
 Pablo Picasso
 Pavel Tchelitchev
 Maurice Utrillo

See also
 List of dancers
 List of female dancers

References

Personalia
 Dance personalia
Lists of people by occupation
Lists of dancers